Laxdale Hall is a 1951 comedy novel by the British writer Eric Linklater. A community in the West Highlands refuses to pay its taxes unless it receives a new road.

Adaptation
It was adapted into the 1953 film of the same title directed by John Eldridge and starring Ronald Squire, Kathleen Ryan and Raymond Huntley.

References

Bibliography
 Goble, Alan. The Complete Index to Literary Sources in Film. Walter de Gruyter, 1999.
 Hart, Francis Russell.  The Scottish Novel: From Smollett to Spark. Harvard University Press, 1978.

1951 British novels
Novels by Eric Linklater
Novels set in Scotland
British novels adapted into films
Jonathan Cape books
British comedy novels